Antheraea alleni is a moth of the family Saturniidae first described by Jeremy Daniel Holloway in 1987. It is found in Borneo.

The wingspan is 45–52 mm for males and about 55 mm for females.

References

Antheraea
Moths of Borneo